Mesoptila murcida is a moth in the family Geometridae. It is found on Java. The habitat consists of montane areas.

The ground colour of the forewings is grey-brown with four dark costal spots. The hindwings are the same colour as the forewings, with darker shading between the anal margin and the discal cell.

References

Moths described in 2012
Eupitheciini